Käthe Lettner (born 13 December 1906, date of death unknown) was an Austrian alpine skier. She competed in the women's combined event at the 1936 Winter Olympics.

References

1906 births
Year of death missing
Austrian female alpine skiers
Olympic alpine skiers of Austria
Alpine skiers at the 1936 Winter Olympics
People from Bad Ischl
Sportspeople from Upper Austria